Michael Lewis (born August 15, 1984) is an American football Defensive End who is currently a free agent. He was signed by the Albany Conquest as an undrafted free agent in 2007. He played college football at Adrian College.

College career
Lewis starred for the Adrian College Bulldogs football team for four years. He originally went to Adrian to be a running back, but after a position switch, he posted the three best sack seasons by a Bulldog and owns the Adrian record for sacks in a single game (4). His 40.0 career sacks and 61.0 tackles for loss are career records. As a senior in 2005, Lewis was named the Michigan Intercollegiate Athletic Association (MIAA) Defensive MVP.

Professional career

Early career
Lewis' first year out of college he played semi-pro football with the Michigan (Flint) Admirals of the North American Football League under coach Don Mathews before receiving an offer to join the Albany Conquest of Arena Football 2. After two seasons with the Conquest, Lewis joined the Peoria Pirates for the 2009 season.

Iowa Barnstormers
Lewis moved up to Arena Football 1 with the af2 folded, joining the Iowa Barnstormers.

Utah Blaze
Lewis moved out west and joined the Utah Blaze in 2011. His sack total earned him 5th place in the league, and earned him a Second Team All-Arena selection. He returned to the Blaze in 2012.

Return to Iowa
Lewis returned to the Barnstormers in 2013, reuniting him with head coach Mike Hohensee, whom had coached him in Peoria. Lewis continued his great sacking ability, moving up the AFL record books for career sacks. Lewis became the 1st player in Arena Football League history to have double digit sacks in three straight seasons (2011-2013).

Las Vegas Outlaws
Lewis joined the Las Vegas Outlaws in 2015.

Orlando Predators
On October 16, 2015, Lewis was assigned to the Orlando Predators.

Los Angeles KISS
On May 24, 2016, Lewis was traded to the Los Angeles KISS for Logan Harrell and John Martinez. Lewis finished his Arena Football League career as the only player in the history of the league to have 3 straight seasons with double digit sack totals. Finished #2 on the Arena Football All Time Quarterback Sacks list.

References

External links
Just Sports Stats
Arena Football League bio

1984 births
Living people
American football defensive ends
Adrian Bulldogs football players
Albany Conquest players
Peoria Pirates players
Iowa Barnstormers players
Utah Blaze players
Las Vegas Outlaws (arena football) players
Orlando Predators players
Los Angeles Kiss players